Luca D'Alessio (born 27 March 2003), known professionally as LDA, is an Italian singer-songwriter and rapper.

Biography 
D'Alessio was born in Naples, son of Italian singer-songwriter Gigi D'Alessio and Carmela Barbato. Following in his father's footsteps, he began to cultivate an immediate interest in music, starting to write and compose his own pieces. On March 27, 2020, he released his debut single "Resta", which was followed by the single "Vediamoci stasera" featuring Italian rapper Astol and Spanish singer Robledo.

In March 2021 he released the single "Vivimi" and later took part as a guest on Gigi D'Alessio's album Buongiorno, duetting on the eponymous track and the single "Di notte". In the same year, he took part in the twenty-first season of talent show Amici di Maria De Filippi, reaching the final stage of the show where he placed fifth in the "Singers" category. During the show experience, the singles "Quello che fa male",  "Sai" and "Scusa" are released, respectively, the former especially was certified platinum which will later be followed by a Spanish version.

On April 25, 2022, he released the single "Bandana", which was certified gold and preceded the release of his first self-titled EP, which debuted at number 3 on the Classifica FIMI Artisti. On 4 December 2022, it was officially announced LDA participation in the Sanremo Music Festival 2023. "Se poi domani" was later announced as his entry for the Sanremo Music Festival 2023.

Discography

Studio albums

Extended plays

Singles

As lead artist

As featured artist

Television

References 

Living people
2003 births
Italian rappers
Italian singer-songwriters
21st-century Italian male musicians
Musicians from Naples